L&Q (London & Quadrant Housing Trust) is a housing association operating in Greater London, the South East, East Anglia, and parts of the North West (under its subsidiary company Trafford Housing Trust). L&Q's registered office is based in Stratford. Quadrant Housing Association, one of its original forebears, was established in 1963.  L&Q is one of the largest housing associations in England. As of 2021, the company owns/manages in excess of 120,000 homes, housing c250,000 residents.

History
The Quadrant Housing Association was formed in the London Borough of Greenwich in 1963 when 32 people invested £2 each to create a housing association. Its founder, Rev Nicolas Stacey, was a Church of England priest who later became head of Social Services for Kent County Council.

In 1973 Quadrant joined forces with another association, London Housing Trust, which had been set up in 1967. The merged organisation was named London & Quadrant Housing Trust.

In 2011, London and Quadrant was criticised by Conservative Party politicians alleging that L&Q had misled the public and MPs over its plans for development on the site of the Walthamstow Stadium.

In December 2016, London and Quadrant merged with the East Thames Housing Group.

In February 2017, L&Q completed a deal to buy the private land company Gallagher Estates for £505 million from Tony Gallagher.

An independent review conducted by Campbell Tickell in 2018 revealed maintenance of some of the company's properties had fallen below standards.

The Times reported in 2019 the company owned 95,000 homes across London and the south-east.

In 2019, L&Q acquired Trafford Housing Trust.

In 2021, Fiona Fletcher-Smith was appointed Group CEO, replacing David Montague CBE.

Quadrant Construction
In  2010, L&Q created an in-house construction practice, Quadrant Construction, which grew by 2016 to a £200m turnover business, making a £4m profit that was given back to the housing association. However, on 23 May 2017, L&Q announced a restructuring which would see Quadrant rebranded, with consultations starting about possible redundancies among the 200-strong workforce.

References

Housing associations based in England
Charities based in London
Housing organisations based in London
Organisations based in the London Borough of Lewisham